Bernard Le Coq (born 25 September 1950) is a French actor. He has appeared in more than one hundred and fifty films since 1967. His first big role Bernard Le Coq has played as Annie Girardot's son and Claude Jade's brother in the family drama Hearth Fires by Serge Korber in 1972. He won a César Award for Best Actor in a Supporting Role in 2002 for his performance as Prof. Christian Licht in Beautiful Memories''.

On Stage

Filmography

References

External links 

 

1950 births
Living people
French male film actors
French male television actors
French male stage actors
20th-century French male actors
21st-century French male actors
Best Supporting Actor César Award winners